Jang Hyun-soo (born 28 September 1991) is a South Korean professional footballer who currently plays for Al-Hilal in the Saudi Professional League.

Club career
On 12 July 2019, Jang joined Saudi Professional League club Al-Hilal on a three-year contract. During the 2019–20 season, he played an important role in Al-Hilal's continental treble.

In 2021, he suppressed Pohang Steelers' attack excellently in the AFC Champions League Final, achieving his second Champions League title.

After Jang led Al-Hilal to three consecutive league titles, they extended the contract with him for one more year on 29 June 2022.

In January 2023, Jang was selected for the Riyadh all-star team, and played a friendly against Paris Saint-Germain. He showed notable performance in both defense and offense as well as scoring a goal. The next month, Jang helped Al-Hilal defeat Wydad Casablanca and Flamengo in the 2022 FIFA Club World Cup. However, he had difficulty defending Real Madrid's attack in the Club World Cup final, and failed to prevent his team's 5–3 defeat.

International career
Jang played as a key player for South Korea under Uli Stielike, Shin Tae-yong and Paulo Bento, and also participated in the 2018 FIFA World Cup. On 1 November 2018, however, Jang received a lifetime ban from representing the national team and received a $26,800 fine from the Korea Football Association after he admitted to falsifying records related to his alternative service. He had previously earned military exemption by winning gold at the 2014 Asian Games.

Career statistics

Club

International

Honours
Al-Hilal
AFC Champions League: 2019, 2021
Saudi Professional League: 2019–20, 2020–21, 2021–22
King Cup: 2019–20
Saudi Super Cup: 2021
FIFA Club World Cup runner-up: 2022

South Korea U23
 Asian Games: 2014

South Korea
AFC Asian Cup runner-up: 2015
EAFF Championship: 2015, 2017

Individual
EAFF Championship Most Valuable Player: 2015
EAFF Championship Best Defender: 2017
AFC Champions League All-Star Squad: 2021

References

External links

  Official Instagram Account 
Profile at FC Tokyo
Jang Hyun-soo – National Team Stats at KFA 

 

Jang Hyun-soo at Asian Games Incheon 2014

1991 births
Living people
Footballers from Seoul
Association football defenders
South Korean footballers
South Korean expatriate footballers
FC Tokyo players
Guangzhou City F.C. players
Al Hilal SFC players
J1 League players
Chinese Super League players
Saudi Professional League players
Expatriate footballers in Japan
Expatriate footballers in China
Expatriate footballers in Saudi Arabia
South Korean expatriate sportspeople in Japan
South Korean expatriate sportspeople in China
South Korean expatriate sportspeople in Saudi Arabia
Yonsei University alumni
Footballers at the 2014 Asian Games
2015 AFC Asian Cup players
Asian Games medalists in football
Footballers at the 2016 Summer Olympics
Olympic footballers of South Korea
Asian Games gold medalists for South Korea
Medalists at the 2014 Asian Games
2018 FIFA World Cup players
South Korea under-20 international footballers
South Korea under-23 international footballers
South Korea international footballers